Fabian Eberle (born 27 July 1992) is a Liechtensteiner footballer who currently plays for FC Konolfingen.

International career
He was a member of the Liechtenstein national under-21 football team and had 13 caps and one goal. Eberle made his senior team debut on 11 November 2011 in a friendly against Hungary.

References

1992 births
Living people
Liechtenstein footballers
Liechtenstein international footballers
Liechtenstein under-21 international footballers
Liechtenstein youth international footballers
Association football defenders